Daniel "Danny" Inglis is a Scottish former professional darts player who played in the British Darts Organisation in the 1970s and 1980s.

Career
Inglis played his debut in the 1984 BDO World Darts Championship, losing 2–1 to Kexi Heinäharju of Finland in the first round. He had earlier reached the quarter-final of the 1983 British Professional, beating World Championship Semi Finals Tony Brown and former Gold Cup Champions Tony Skuse before losing to 3 Times World Champion John Lowe.

Inglis quit the BDO in 1986.

He now plays local league darts in Fife.

World Championship results

BDO
 1984: Last 32: (lost to Kexi Heinaharju 1–2) (sets)

External links
Profile and stats at Darts Database

Scottish darts players
Living people
British Darts Organisation players
1948 births